Hungry is the second studio album by the American band XYZ, released in 1991. The band supported the album by touring with Foreigner.

Critical reception

The Calgary Herald wrote that "XYZ churn out an effort as simple as A,B,C and the tunes are about as elementary too." The Record opined that "what makes XYZ palatable is the almost total lack of pretense surrounding the group's words and music... For these guys, it is only rock-and-roll and there's much to like in the way they play it."

Track listing 
"Face Down in the Gutter"
"Don't Say No"
"Fire and Water"
"When the Night Comes Down"
"Off to the Sun"
"Feels Good"
"Shake Down the Walls"
"When I Find Love"
"H.H. Boogie"
"The Sun Also Rises in Hell"
"A Roll of the Dice"
"Whiskey on a Heartache"
"Two Wrongs Can Make a Right" (bonus track)

References

External links 
"Face Down in the Gutter" video clip as shown on Headbangers Ball

XYZ (American band) albums
1991 albums
Capitol Records albums
Albums produced by Neil Kernon